Vapnik–Chervonenkis theory (also known as VC theory) was developed during 1960–1990 by Vladimir Vapnik and Alexey Chervonenkis. The theory is a form of computational learning theory, which attempts to explain the learning process from a statistical point of view.

Introduction 
VC theory covers at least four parts (as explained in The Nature of Statistical Learning Theory):
Theory of consistency of learning processes 
What are (necessary and sufficient) conditions for consistency of a learning process based on the empirical risk minimization principle?
Nonasymptotic theory of the rate of convergence of learning processes 
How fast is the rate of convergence of the learning process?
Theory of controlling the generalization ability of learning processes
How can one control the rate of convergence (the generalization ability) of the learning process?
Theory of constructing learning machines
How can one construct algorithms that can control the generalization ability?

VC Theory is a major subbranch of statistical learning theory. One of its main applications in statistical learning theory is to provide generalization conditions for learning algorithms.  From this point of view, VC theory is related to stability, which is an alternative approach for characterizing generalization.

In addition, VC theory and VC dimension are instrumental in the theory of empirical processes, in the case of processes indexed by VC classes. Arguably these are the most important applications of the VC theory, and are employed in proving generalization. Several techniques will be introduced that are widely used in the empirical process and VC theory. The discussion is mainly based on the book Weak Convergence and Empirical Processes: With Applications to Statistics.

Overview of VC theory in empirical processes

Background on empirical processes 
Let  be a measurable space.

Measurability issues will be ignored here, for more technical detail see. Let  be a class of measurable functions  and define:

Then define the empirical measure

where  here stands for the Dirac measure. The empirical measure induces a map  given by:

Now suppose  is the underlying true distribution of the data, which is unknown. Empirical Processes theory aims at identifying classes  for which statements such as the following hold:

uniform law of large numbers:

uniformly for all .

uniform central limit theorem:  

In the former case  is called Glivenko–Cantelli class, and in the latter case (under the assumption ) the class  is called Donsker or -Donsker. A Donsker class is Glivenko–Cantelli in probability by an application of Slutsky's theorem .

These statements are true for a single , by standard LLN, CLT arguments under regularity conditions, and the difficulty in the Empirical Processes comes in because joint statements are being made for all . Intuitively then, the set  cannot be too large, and as it turns out that the geometry of  plays a very important role.

One way of measuring how big the function set  is to use the so-called covering numbers. The covering number

is the minimal number of balls  needed to cover the set  (here it is obviously assumed that there is an underlying norm on ).  The entropy is the logarithm of the covering number.

Two sufficient conditions are provided below, under which it can be proved that the set  is Glivenko–Cantelli or Donsker.

A class  is -Glivenko–Cantelli if it is -measurable with envelope  such that  and satisfies:

The next condition is a version of the celebrated Dudley's theorem. If  is a class of functions such that

then  is -Donsker for every probability measure  such that . In the last integral, the notation means

.

Symmetrization 
The majority of the arguments of how to bound the empirical process, rely on symmetrization, maximal and concentration inequalities and chaining.  Symmetrization is usually the first step of the proofs, and since it is used in many machine learning proofs on bounding empirical loss functions (including the proof of the VC inequality which is discussed in the next section) it is presented here.

Consider the empirical process:

Turns out that there is a connection between the empirical and the following symmetrized process:

The symmetrized process is a Rademacher process, conditionally on the data . Therefore, it is a sub-Gaussian process by Hoeffding's inequality.

Lemma (Symmetrization). For every nondecreasing, convex  and class of measurable functions ,

The proof of the Symmetrization lemma relies on introducing independent copies of the original variables  (sometimes referred to as a ghost sample) and replacing the inner expectation of the LHS by these copies. After an application of Jensen's inequality different signs could be introduced (hence the name symmetrization) without changing the expectation. The proof can be found below because of its instructive nature.

VC Connection 
It turns out that there is a fascinating connection between certain combinatorial properties of the set  and the entropy numbers. Uniform  covering numbers can be controlled by the notion of Vapnik–Chervonenkis classes of sets – or shortly VC sets.

Sauer's lemma then states that the number  of subsets picked out by a VC-class  satisfies:

Which is a polynomial number  of subsets rather than an exponential number. Intuitively this means that a finite VC-index implies that  has an apparent simplistic structure.

A similar bound can be shown (with a different constant, same rate) for the so-called VC subgraph classes. For a function  the subgraph is a subset of  such that: .

It can then be shown that quite remarkably, for :

Then if

the following is valid for the convex hull of :

The important consequence of this fact is that

 

which is just enough so that the entropy integral is going to converge, and therefore the class  is going to be -Donsker.

Finally an example of a VC-subgraph class is considered.

Proof: Take  points . The vectors:

Take , a vector that is orthogonal to this subspace. Therefore:

Consider the set . This set cannot be picked out since if there is some  such that  that would imply that the LHS is strictly positive but the RHS is non-positive.

There are generalizations of the notion VC subgraph class, e.g. there is the notion of pseudo-dimension. The interested reader can look into.

VC inequality 
A similar setting is considered, which is more common to machine learning. A function  is called a classifier. Let  be a set of classifiers. Similarly to the previous section, define the shattering coefficient (also known as growth function):

We can thus define  to be the collection of subsets obtained from the above mapping for every . Therefore, in terms of the previous section the shattering coefficient is precisely

.

Let  is an observed dataset. Assume that the data is generated by an unknown probability distribution . Define  to be the expected 0/1 loss. However the empirical risk, given by:

can certainly be evaluated. Then one has the following Theorem:

Theorem (VC Inequality)
For binary classification and the 0/1 loss function we have the following generalization bounds:

In words the VC inequality is saying that as the sample increases, provided that  has a finite VC dimension, the empirical 0/1 risk becomes a good proxy for the expected 0/1 risk.

The connection between this framework and the Empirical Process framework is evident. Here one is dealing with a modified empirical process

but not surprisingly the ideas are the same. The proof of the (first part of) VC inequality, relies on symmetrization, and then argue conditionally on the data using concentration inequalities (in particular Hoeffding's inequality). The interested reader can check the book  Theorems 12.4 and 12.5.

References 

 See references in articles: Richard M. Dudley, empirical processes, Shattered set. 
 

Computational learning theory
Empirical process